Zanaqol (also Romanized as Zanāqol; also known as Zanā QolĪ) is a village in Bizaki Rural District, Golbajar District, Chenaran County, Razavi Khorasan Province, Iran. At the 2006 census, its population was 189, in 51 families.

References 

Populated places in Chenaran County